Vandana Rao is a former Indian track and field athlete who represented India in 1984 and 1988 Olympics in 4 × 400 m women relay race. She is an Asian Games Gold medalist.
She was awarded Arjuna award by government of India for her achievements.

Career 
Vandana Rao has represented India in the following International athletic events.

 1982 Asian Games
 1984 Summer Olympics
 1985 Asian Track n Field
 1985 IAAF World Cup
 1986  Four Nations and ASIAN Games
 1987 Asian Track n Field and World Championship
 1988 Summer Olympics

Awards 

 Karnataka State Rajyotsva Award in 1984
 Arjuna Award in 1987

Personal life 
She is married to former Indian hockey player and head coach, Joaquim Carvalho.

References
sports references
25 years later
Times of India photo

https://bookofachievers.com/articles/victorious-vandana-was-part-of-the-olympic-relay-quartet-she-shares-her-journey
https://www.thehindu.com/news/cities/Mangalore/commitment-and-hard-training-required-to-succeed-in-sports/article3737560.ece
https://www.sportskeeda.com/athletics/indias-best-athletic-performances-at-olympics/4
https://www.the-sports.org/vandana-rao-athletics-spf37356.html
https://www.livemint.com/mint-lounge/features/stories-of-indian-women-athletes-who-dared-11581056928066.html
https://www.thehindu.com/features/metroplus/On-a-different-track-now/article16651411.ece
https://indianathletics.in/medal-winners-of-asian-games/
https://www.olympic.ind.in/winners-and-athletes?id=285
https://www.newindianexpress.com/sport/2010/mar/28/sprint-quartet-reunite-after-24-years-143019.html

External links
 

1963 births
Living people
Sportswomen from Karnataka
Indian female sprinters
Indian female middle-distance runners
20th-century Indian women
20th-century Indian people
Olympic athletes of India
Athletes (track and field) at the 1984 Summer Olympics
Athletes (track and field) at the 1988 Summer Olympics
Asian Games medalists in athletics (track and field)
Athletes (track and field) at the 1986 Asian Games
Recipients of the Arjuna Award
Asian Games gold medalists for India
Medalists at the 1986 Asian Games
Olympic female sprinters